Kegg's Candies  is a confectionery company which specializes in handmade chocolates. It is located in Houston, Texas, and has been called "legendary" by the local press. The company was founded in 1946 by Robert Kegg. Upon his retirement in the 1980s, the business stayed in the Kegg's family for 10 years and then was sold to John Toomey, a Houston businessman. Carl Bartuch Jr., the present owner, bought the business from Toomey in 2004.

In 2009, the company bought a new facility in Southwest Houston that covers 11,000 square feet, five times the size of their previous location. The company makes 30,000 to 40,000 pounds of candy each year, and creates handmade items.

References

External links 
Official Website

American chocolate companies
Companies based in Houston
American companies established in 1946
1946 establishments in Texas